The teams competing in Group 8 of the 2009 UEFA European Under-21 Championship qualifying competition are Belarus, Hungary, Latvia, San Marino and Serbia.

Standings

Matches

Match originally ended as 2–0 win for Latvia. Later it was awarded as a 3–0 forfeit win for Latvia as San Marino fielded an ineligible player.

Goalscorers

1 goal
: Mikhail Afanasyev, Syarhey Kislyak, Aliaksei Kuchuk, Anton Putsila, Dmitry Verkhovtsov
: Balázs Farkas, Attila Filkor, Ádám Hrepka, Gellért Ivancsics, Ádám Szabó
: Aleksandrs Fertovs, Edgars Gauračs, Vladimirs Kamešs, Igors Kozlovs, Oļegs Malašenoks, Ivans Lukjanovs
: Enrico Cibelli
: Nikola Đurđić, Ljubomir Fejsa, Predrag Pavlović, Nemanja Pejčinović, Zoran Tošić
Own goals
: Nikola Petković

Group 8